Fayette is a town in Lafayette County, Wisconsin, United States. The population was 376 at the 2010 census. The unincorporated communities of Fayette and Yellowstone are located in the town.

Geography
Fayette is in northeastern Lafayette County and is bordered to the north by Iowa County. Yellowstone Lake is a reservoir on the Yellowstone River in the eastern part of the town.

Demographics
As of the census of 2000, there were 366 people, 138 households, and 100 families residing in the town. The population density was 10.4 people per square mile (4.0/km2). There were 155 housing units at an average density of 4.4 per square mile (1.7/km2). The racial makeup of the town was 100.00% White.

There were 138 households, out of which 37.0% had children under the age of 18 living with them, 63.8% were married couples living together, 2.9% had a female householder with no husband present, and 27.5% were non-families. 21.7% of all households were made up of individuals, and 8.0% had someone living alone who was 65 years of age or older. The average household size was 2.65 and the average family size was 3.18.

In the town, the population was spread out, with 28.1% under the age of 18, 7.9% from 18 to 24, 28.4% from 25 to 44, 21.9% from 45 to 64, and 13.7% who were 65 years of age or older. The median age was 36 years. For every 100 females, there were 114.0 males. For every 100 females age 18 and over, there were 119.2 males.

The median income for a household in the town was $36,250, and the median income for a family was $40,625. Males had a median income of $23,750 versus $21,806 for females. The per capita income for the town was $16,566. About 5.7% of families and 9.7% of the population were below the poverty line, including 15.6% of those under age 18 and 3.4% of those age 65 or over.

Notable people
Robert McKee Bashford, jurist and politician
Therese A. Jenkins, activist
Eugene D. Parkinson, farmer and politician
Buck Zumhofe, professional wrestler

Recreation
Yellowstone Lake State Park is on the north side of Yellowstone Lake and offers camping, picnicking, and a swimming beach. The south side of the lake is part of the Yellowstone State Wildlife Area.

References

Towns in Lafayette County, Wisconsin
Towns in Wisconsin